The Carrisa Lookout Complex, in Lincoln National Forest in or near Long Canyon, New Mexico  Long Canyon was built in 1934.  It was listed on the National Register of Historic Places in 1988.

The listing included two contributing buildings and a contributing structure.

photos only

References

Fire lookout towers on the National Register of Historic Places in New Mexico
National Register of Historic Places in Otero County, New Mexico
Buildings and structures completed in 1934
1934 establishments in New Mexico